The 2007 Mid-American Conference baseball tournament took place in May 2007. The top six regular season finishers met in the double-elimination tournament held at Oestrike Stadium on the campus of Eastern Michigan University in Ypsilanti, Michigan. This was the nineteenth Mid-American Conference postseason tournament to determine a champion. Second seed  won their sixth tournament championship to earn the conference's automatic bid to the 2007 NCAA Division I baseball tournament.

Seeding and format 
The winner of each division claimed the top two seeds, while the next four finishers based on conference winning percentage only, regardless of division, participated in the tournament. The teams played double-elimination tournament. This was the tenth year of the six team tournament.

Results

All-Tournament Team 
The following players were named to the All-Tournament Team.

Most Valuable Player 
Jason Patton was named Tournament Most Valuable Player. Patton played for Kent State.

References 

Tournament
Mid-American Conference Baseball Tournament
Mid-American Conference baseball tournament
Mid-American Conference baseball tournament